Miriam Vázquez (born 9 March 1985) is an Argentine alpine skier. She competed in the women's downhill at the 2006 Winter Olympics.

References

1985 births
Living people
Argentine female alpine skiers
Olympic alpine skiers of Argentina
Alpine skiers at the 2006 Winter Olympics
Skiers from Buenos Aires